The 2025 Summer World Masters Games, commonly known as Taipei & New Taipei 2025, is a forthcoming international multi-sport event that is scheduled to take place from 17 May to 30 May 2025 in Taipei and New Taipei, Taiwan.

It will be third international multi-sport event to be held in Taipei–Keelung metropolitan area after the 2009 Summer Deaflympics and 2017 Summer Universiade.

Bidding process 
The three candidate cities were Taipei/ New Taipei, Paris and Perth.

Host city selection 
The International Masters Games Association (IMGA) voted to select the host city of the 2025 Summer World Masters Games on 21 October 2020, Taipei/ New Taipei was selected, and sign contract on 23 December 2020.

Development and preparation 
The Taipei/ New Taipei Organizing Committee was headed by mayor Ko Wen-je and Hou Yu-ih, it began operation on 7 May 2021.

The Games

Opening ceremony 
The opening ceremony will hold on May 17, 2025, in the Taipei Dome in Taipei.

Sports 
The Organizing Committee, in addition to the 19 compulsory sports, opted to add thirteen more sports in the program of this edition of the Games.

 
 
 
 
 Baseball
 
 
 
 
 Slalom
 Sprint
 
 BMX freestyle
 BMX racing
 Mountain biking
 Road cycling
 Track cycling
 
 
 
 
 
 
 
 
 
 Volleyball (indoor)
 Beach volleyball
 
 
 Aquatics
 
 
 
 
 
 Kata
 Kumite

See also 

 World Masters Games
 List of sporting events in Taiwan

References 

Summer World Masters Games
Masters Games
International sports competitions hosted by Taiwan
2025 in multi-sport events
Multi-sport events in Taiwan